Michael Barry Sullivan (born February 27, 1968) is an American ice hockey coach and former player. He is the current head coach of the Pittsburgh Penguins of the National Hockey League (NHL). He was a fourth round selection, 69th overall, by the New York Rangers at the 1987 NHL Entry Draft and played 11 NHL seasons with the San Jose Sharks, Calgary Flames, Boston Bruins, and Phoenix Coyotes. Internationally, he represented the United States twice, including at the 1997 World Championship.

Sullivan turned to coaching upon his retirement in 2002 and served two seasons as the head coach of the Boston Bruins between 2003 and 2005. He has formerly been an assistant coach with the Tampa Bay Lightning, New York Rangers, and Vancouver Canucks, and subsequently served in the department of player development with the Chicago Blackhawks for one year. After serving as head coach of the Wilkes-Barre/Scranton Penguins, he took over as head coach of the Pittsburgh Penguins in December 2015, and led the team to back-to-back Stanley Cup championships becoming the only American-born coach to win the Stanley Cup more than once.

Sullivan was named head coach of the United States men's national ice hockey team for the 2022 Winter Olympics, but with the NHL withdrawing from the Olympics due to a COVID-19 surge, David Quinn, former head coach of the New York Rangers, was named as his replacement.

Early life
Sullivan was born on February 27, 1968, in Marshfield, Massachusetts to Irish-American parents George and Myrna. Sullivan is their second youngest child and played hockey growing up under the tutelage of his father. While Sullivan and his brothers played hockey, his two sisters Kathie and Debbie figure skated.

Playing career
Sullivan played high school hockey at Boston College High School and college hockey at Boston University where he scored a game-winning goal in the Beanpot Tournament. He was drafted 69th overall by the New York Rangers in the 1987 NHL Entry Draft. He elected to remain at BU to finish school, and in 1990, he began an 11-year National Hockey League career in which he accumulated 54 goals, 82 assists, 136 points and 203 penalty minutes in 709 games.

Coaching career

Sullivan began coaching professional hockey during the 2002–2003 season, when he became the head coach of the Providence Bruins of the AHL. In his only season, his team had a 41–17–9–4 record.

Sullivan was hired as the 26th head coach of the Boston Bruins in 2003 by then-general manager Mike O'Connell. His first season with the Bruins was highly successful, as he led them to a 41–19–15–7 record, 104 points and a first-place finish in the Northeast Division. However, they were eliminated in the first round of the playoffs by the Montreal Canadiens. After the lockout, Sullivan and the Bruins struggled to win in the new NHL, as they ended the 2005–2006 season with a dismal 29–37–16 record, missing the playoffs and finishing last in the Northeast Division. He was subsequently fired by the incoming general manager Peter Chiarelli on June 27, 2006, and was replaced by Dave Lewis.

Sullivan served as an assistant coach of the U.S. Olympic hockey team at the 2006 Winter Olympics in Torino, Italy.

On May 31, 2007, he was named assistant coach of the Tampa Bay Lightning. He was then promoted to associate coach the following season. On July 16, 2009, he was named assistant coach of the New York Rangers.

On July 3, 2013, he was named assistant coach of the Vancouver Canucks.

On January 20, 2014, Sullivan was named interim head coach of the Canucks, while head coach John Tortorella served a six-game suspension. On January 21, in his first game as acting head coach, the Canucks would go on to record a 2–1 victory over the Edmonton Oilers.

On May 1, 2014, Sullivan, along with head coach John Tortorella, were relieved of their respective duties in the Canucks organization. Sullivan subsequently joined the Chicago Blackhawks as a player development coach.

On June 18, 2015, the Pittsburgh Penguins named Sullivan as the new head coach of their American Hockey League affiliate, the Wilkes-Barre/Scranton Penguins.

He was named head coach of the Pittsburgh Penguins on December 12, 2015, upon the firing of then-head coach Mike Johnston.

On June 12, 2016, Sullivan became just the sixth head coach in NHL history to win the Stanley Cup after being hired mid-season. He did so when the Penguins defeated the San Jose Sharks in the 2016 Stanley Cup Finals. Sullivan joined both Scotty Bowman (1992) and Dan Bylsma (2009) as the third coach in franchise history to win the Stanley Cup following a mid-season coaching change. Sullivan is also the first coach to lead the Penguins to consecutive Stanley Cup championships with their victory over the Nashville Predators in the 2017 Stanley Cup Finals, and is the only American-born head coach to win the Stanley Cup multiple times.

On December 16, 2017, he recorded his 100th career win with the Penguins becoming just the fourth coach to do so for the organization.

On July 5, 2019, Sullivan signed a four-year contract extension.

After a 5–2 win against the Chicago Blackhawks on October 16, 2021, Sullivan became the winningest coach in the Penguins history, surpassing Dan Bylsma's record with 253 wins behind the Penguins bench.

Personal life
Sullivan and his wife, Kate, have three children, daughters Kaitlin and Kiley and son Matthew.

Career statistics

Regular season and playoffs

International

Head coaching record

NHL

 Shortened season due to the COVID-19 pandemic during the 2019–20 season. Playoffs were played in August 2020 with a different format.

AHL

References

External links
 

1968 births
American men's ice hockey centers
American ice hockey coaches
Boston Bruins coaches
Boston Bruins players
Boston College High School alumni
Boston University Terriers men's ice hockey players
Calgary Flames players
Chicago Blackhawks coaches
Ice hockey coaches from Massachusetts
Kansas City Blades players
Living people
National Hockey League assistant coaches
New York Rangers coaches
New York Rangers draft picks
People from Marshfield, Massachusetts
Phoenix Coyotes players
Pittsburgh Penguins coaches
Providence Bruins coaches
Saint John Flames players
San Diego Gulls (IHL) players
San Jose Sharks players
Sportspeople from Plymouth County, Massachusetts
Stanley Cup champions
Stanley Cup championship-winning head coaches
Tampa Bay Lightning coaches
Vancouver Canucks coaches
Wilkes-Barre/Scranton Penguins head coaches
Ice hockey players from Massachusetts